Manitoulin Secondary School, is a secondary school located on M'Chigeeng First Nation, Ontario, on Manitoulin Island, and is approximately 2 hours from downtown Sudbury.

The school, built in 1969, is within by the Rainbow District School Board's jurisdiction.

History
Research conducted over a 10-year period in the 1970s revealed a trend at Manitoulin Secondary School of directing First Nations students into the lower academic streams. The study also showed nearly all suspensions and expulsions were of First Nations students, despite them forming less than half of the student body. As a result, Wikwemikong removed their children from Rainbow District and formed their own high school in their community, resulting in a significant decline in the student population at Manitoulin Secondary School.

In 2015, an Indigenous student at the school left after receiving backlash for reporting a racist incident from school administrators.

In 2018, a fight broke out on the school grounds involving 50 students, both European-Canadian and Indigenous. The Chief of M'Chigeeng First Nation wrote an open letter stating, "that this incident is an indicator of a deeper, more disturbing reality, which is underlying racism that has now reared its ugly head yet again." The school hosted an "anti-racism rally" in response to these events. Despite involvement in the fight from both sides, police only charged Indigenous students.

See also
List of high schools in Ontario

References

External links
Manitoulin Secondary School at the Rainbow District School Board
Manitoulin Secondary School at the Ministry of Education

High schools in Ontario
1969 establishments in Ontario
Educational institutions established in 1969